The Pātea Dam is a high compacted earth fill–type hydroelectric dam in Taranaki, New Zealand, constructed between 1980 and 1984.

It was the first dam constructed using tertiary sandstone and siltstone as fill materials. The dam impounds Lake Rotorangi, which is the longest man-made lake in New Zealand.

Pātea Hydro Electric Scheme
The Pātea Hydro Electric Scheme was commissioned in May 1984 and was built for the South Taranaki District Council. After construction difficulties, wetter than normal conditions had caused a six-month delay. Since 1999 it is owned and operated by TrustPower.

References

External links

 Trust Power - Patea power station

Dams completed in 1984
Dams in New Zealand
Buildings and structures in Taranaki
Earth-filled dams
South Taranaki District
1980s architecture in New Zealand